Isparta Süleyman Demirel Airport , inaugurated on July 21, 1997, is an airport serving the city of Isparta in south-western Turkey. Located in the Keçiborlu district, it is 28 km from the city. The airport is named after the 9th President of Turkey, Süleyman Demirel, who was a native of Isparta.

Facilities
The airport's passenger terminal which can also serve international flights, covers an area of 5,400 m2 and has an annual capacity of 600,000 passengers.

Airlines and destinations

Statistics
In 2006, 38,258 passengers used the airport, which was visited by 545 passenger planes and 475 cargo planes. Due to the low passenger capacity of the hinterland, the airport could not be continuously operated at a profit. Low cost airlines flew the airport on scheduled flights in the past for a couple of months only.

Below is the passenger data and development for Isparta Süleyman Demirel Airport for the year 2020.

See also
 Atlasjet Flight 4203

References

Airports in Turkey
Buildings and structures in Isparta Province
Transport in Isparta Province
Airports established in 1997
1997 establishments in Turkey